Cuzdrioara is a commune in Cluj County, Transylvania, Romania. It is composed of three villages: Cuzdrioara, Mănășturel (Kismonostorszeg) and Valea Gârboului (Gorbóvölgye).

Demographics 
According to the census from 2002 there was a total population of 2,975 people living in this commune. Of this population, 82.38% are ethnic Romanians,  11.36% ethnic Romani and 6.18% are ethnic Hungarians.

Notes

Communes in Cluj County
Localities in Transylvania